The 1912 Northwestern Purple team represented Northwestern University during the 1912 college football season. In their third and final year under head coach Charles Hammett, the Purple compiled a 2–3–1 record (2–3 against Western Conference opponents) and finished in fifth place in the Western Conference.

Schedule

References

Northwestern
Northwestern Wildcats football seasons
Northwestern Purple football